Leslie Cain (born January 13, 1948) is an American former starting pitcher in Major League Baseball who played for the Detroit Tigers. He batted and threw left-handed. In a four-season career, Cain posted a 23–19 record with 303 strikeouts and a 3.98 earned run average (ERA) in 373 innings. Cain was a promising pitcher who had his career cut short by an arm injury.

Baseball career
In his 1968 rookie season with the Detroit Tigers, he went 1–0 with a 3.00 earned run average (ERA) in eight appearances, including four starts, but he was out the following season after developing arm problems.

In 1970 Cain recorded 12 victories and 156 strikeouts in 180 innings pitched, and finished 1971 with a 10–9 mark in 145 innings.

On August 28, 1971, Cain hit the last home run by a Tigers pitcher before the American League adopted the designated hitter rule in 1973. A Tiger pitcher did not hit a home run again until 2005.

Workman's compensation case
Cain contended he was forced to pitch by Detroit manager Billy Martin while he had a sore arm. Cain later claimed that it did permanent damage to his arm and he sued the Tigers. In a landmark decision, the Michigan Bureau of Workman's Compensation ordered the Tigers to pay Cain $111 a week for the rest of his life.

Personal life
Cain married Vera Nell Washington in 1968. He has a son, Brian Earl Cain, and a grandson, Brian Earl Cain, Jr.

References

External links

 Baseball Almanac

1948 births
Living people
African-American baseball players
Detroit Tigers players
Major League Baseball pitchers
Daytona Beach Islanders players
Toledo Mud Hens players
Montgomery Rebels players
Phoenix Giants players
Baseball players from California
People from San Luis Obispo, California
21st-century African-American people
20th-century African-American sportspeople